Melaka Tengah District (Central Malacca) is one of the 4 administrative districts in Malacca, Malaysia. It borders Masjid Tanah District to the north-west, Alor Gajah District to the north and Jasin District to the east. The capital of the state, Malacca City, is located in this district. This district is the major destination of tourists in Malacca as most historical spots are situated within it.

Government

Melaka Tengah is administered by two local authorities, which are Historical Malacca City Council (MBMB) and Hang Tuah Jaya Municipal Council (MPHTJ).

Administrative divisions

Melaka Tengah consists of 29 mukim, 44 towns and 95 villages.

The 29 mukims in Melaka Tengah are:

Federal parliament and state assembly seats

There are 3 Federal Parliament seats and 13 State Assembly seats in Melaka Tengah District.

List of Melaka Tengah district representatives in the Federal Assembly (Dewan Rakyat)

List of Melaka Tengah district representatives in the State Legislative Assembly (Dewan Undangan Negeri)

Demographics

There are around more than 503,000 residents in Melaka Tengah, which composes of 303,000 Malays (58%), 169,000 Chinese (32%), 22,000 Indians (4%) and others.

Economy

The main economy sector of the district is industry, in which Melaka Tengah has ten industrial areas with a total area of 1,309 hectares. The second most important economy sector for the district is tourism, where the major tourist attractions are located at Malacca City, Ayer Keroh and Besar Island. The third most important economy sector is agriculture, in which 55% of Melaka Tengah area is used for rubber plantation, palm oil plantation and rice fields.

Industrial areas 
 Taman Tasik Utama Industrial Area

Education

Schools
For primary and secondary education, there are 87 primary schools and 35 high schools in Melaka Tengah. For higher education, colleges and universities in the district are Universiti Teknikal Malaysia Melaka, Malacca Foundation College, Malacca Malay Female Teacher's Institute, Malacca Industrial Institute and Multimedia University.

Libraries
The Malacca Public Library at Bukit Baru is the state library of Malacca. Two other libraries are located at the Malacca State Mosque and Jonker Street.

Tourist attractions

Historical architectures

Galleries
Galleries in Melaka Tengah are Gallery of Admiral Cheng Ho, Jehan Chan Art Gallery, Macau Gallery Melaka, Melaka Art Gallery and Melaka Bee Gallery.

Museums
Museums in Melaka Tengah are Aborigines Museum, Baba Nyonya Heritage Museum, Beauty Museum, Cheng Ho Cultural Museum, Chitty Museum, Democratic Government Museum, Education Museum, Governor's Museum, History and Ethnography Museum, Kite Museum, Melaka Al-Quran Museum, Melaka Islamic Museum, Melaka Literature Museum, Melaka Stamp Museum, Melaka Sultanate Palace Museum, Melaka UMNO Museum, Malay and Islamic World Museum, Malaysia Architecture Museum, Malaysia Prison Museum, Malaysia Youth Museum, Maritime Museum, People's Museum, Pulau Besar Museum, Royal Malaysian Customs Department Museum, Royal Malaysian Navy Museum, Straits Chinese Jewellery Museum, Submarine Museum and Toy Museum.

Nature

Nature-related tourist attractions in Melaka Tengah are Melaka Tropical Fruit Farm and Sungai Udang Recreational Forest.

Infrastructures

See also
 Districts of Malaysia

References